Robert Wallace Johnson (March 4, 1936 – November 12, 2019), nicknamed "Rocky", was an American professional baseball player. Largely a utility infielder and pinch hitter, Johnson appeared in 11 Major League Baseball seasons, from 1960 through 1970.  

Johnson was a member of the 1966 World Series champion Baltimore Orioles.

Johnson played for seven teams during his 11-season MLB career — which began with the Kansas City Athletics and ended with the same franchise, when it was based in Oakland. He was a member of the expansion Washington Senators during their maiden season in the American League, then moved on to the Orioles, where he would play four full seasons and establish himself as a top pinch hitter. In 1964 he led the American League with 45 pinch hit at bats and 15 pinch hits. Three years later, in 1967, Johnson collected 13 pinch hits in 34 at-bats in a  season split between the Orioles and the National League's New York Mets.

Although Johnson's career batting average was only .272, he twice hit over .340 as a part-time player, for the 1967 Mets (.348) and the 1969 Athletics (.343).  During the latter season, Johnson made 14 pinch hits in 50 at bats, in a season divided between Oakland and the St. Louis Cardinals. 

In the field, Johnson played every infield position: shortstop (201 games), second base (167), third base (166) and first base (107).  He collected 66 pinch hits in 243 career at bats — to match his career overall batting average of .272. 

Johnson died on November 12, 2019 at age 83.

References

External links

1936 births
2019 deaths
Atlanta Braves players
Augusta Tigers players
Baltimore Orioles players
Baseball players from Nebraska
Birmingham Barons players
Charleston Senators players
Cincinnati Reds players
Idaho Falls Russets players
Iowa Oaks players
Kansas City Athletics players
Major League Baseball infielders
Minnesota Golden Gophers baseball players
New York Mets players
Oakland Athletics players
Panama City Fliers players
Pauls Valley Raiders players
Rochester Red Wings players
St. Louis Cardinals players
Sportspeople from Omaha, Nebraska
Toronto Maple Leafs (International League) players
Valdosta Tigers players
Washington Senators (1961–1971) players